The Ituzaingó Formation, in older literature also described as Entre Ríos or Entrerriana Formation, is an extensive geological formation of Late Miocene (Tortonian, or Huayquerian in the SALMA classification) age in the Paraná Basin of the Corrientes, Santa Fe and Entre Ríos Provinces in Mesopotamia, northeastern Argentina. The formation comprises mudstones, cross-bedded sandstones and conglomerates deposited in a fluvio-deltaic environment and is renowned for the preservation of a rich fossil assemblage, including many mammals, birds, reptiles, fish, bivalves, foraminifera, ichnofossils and flora.

Description 

The Ituzaingó Formation was first described by De Alba in 1953 and later by Herbst in 1971. The Ituzaingó Formation crops out in the northeasternmost part of Argentina (Mesopotamia), in the provinces of Corrientes, Santa Fe and Entre Ríos, among other locations along the banks of the Paraná River.

Stratigraphy 
The formation overlies the marine Paraná Formation and is unconformably overlain by the Puerto Alvear, Hernandarías and Yupoí Formations of Early Pleistocene (Uquian and Ensenadan respectively) age. At the shores of the Paraná River, the formation underlies the Timbúes Formation. In certain places along the same river, the formation cuts into the underlying Rosario Formation.

The formation contains a basal conglomeratic member "Conglomerado osífero" (bony conglomerate) with abundant vertebrate remains. This conglomerate is overlain by almost unfossiliferous whitish to yellow brown sandstones and green mudstones. The Ituzaingó Formation (as Entre Ríos Formation) was correlated with the Puelches Formation of the subsurface of Buenos Aires Province. According to the mammals occurring in the conglomerate and the stratigraphic relationships, the age of the base of Ituzaingo Formation is almost exclusively Tortonian (Late Miocene) or Huayquerian in the SALMA classification.

Depositional environment 
The formation, as the Paraná and Puelches Formations, has been deposited in a vast Miocene tidal flat environment. Both the terrestrial and freshwater fauna of the Ituzaingó Formation indicates a climate warmer than present. The freshwater vertebrate record suggests important basin connections with Amazonian basins.

Alternatively, the Conglomerado Osífero Member has been interpreted as tide-dominated fluvial channels, pertaining to the marine Paraná Formation.

Fossil content 
The Ituzaingó Formation has provided a large variety of fossils, of various groups, from mammals to birds and reptiles to fish and flora. The terrestrial fauna is predominant while a few marine genera are also present. The presence of typical Amazonian freshwater fish and absence of austral fauna in both the underlying Paraná and the Ituzaingó Formation suggests a connection with northern areas of South America. The faunas has been correlated to the older Miocene faunas of the Honda Group at La Venta in Colombia, the Urumaco Formation at Urumaco in Venezuela and the Pebas Formation of the Amazon region of Colombia, Ecuador, Peru and Brazil. Several ground sloth genera present in the Ituzaingó Formation are endemic from this unit, whereas other are also present in the Arroyo Chasicó Formation of Buenos Aires Province, the Andalhuala and Corral Quemado Formations of Catamarca Province, and the Toro Negro Formation of La Rioja Province.

Huayquerian correlations

See also 
 South American land mammal ages
 Honda Group
 Pebas Formation
 Urumaco
 Battle of Ituzaingó

References

Bibliography 
 El Neógeno de la Mesopotamia argentina

Further reading 
 
 
 
 

 
Geologic formations of Argentina
Miocene Series of South America
Huayquerian
Neogene Argentina
Sandstone formations
Mudstone formations
Conglomerate formations
Deltaic deposits
Fluvial deposits
Tidal deposits
Paleontology in Argentina
Formations
Formations
Formations
Tupi–Guarani languages